Micronia aculeata is a species of moth of subfamily Microniinae of family Uraniidae found in India and Sri Lanka towards Sulawesi. It was first described by Achille Guenée in 1857.

Description 
Its wingspan is 42–50 mm. Head, thorax, and abdomen white with a fuscous tinge. Wings white, closely striated with fuscous; somewhat ill-defined antemedial, medial, and postmedial fuscous oblique bands; a fine marginal line and black spot at base of tail of hindwing. Underside white or fuscous. Palpi are porrect, slender and rather long. Antennae thickened and flattened. 
Fore wing with the acute costa arched towards apex. However, the outer margin is straight.

Gallery

References 

Uraniidae
Moths described in 1857